Kokradanga is a village in South Salmara-Mankachar District, Assam, India.

About Kokradanga
According to the census of 2011, the location code or village code  of Kokradanga pt III village is 28166. Kokradanga pt III village is located in Mankachar tehsil of South Salmara-Mankachar district in Assam, India. It is situated 3 km away from district headquarters Hatsingimari. Hatsingimari is district headquarters of South Salmara-Mankachar. As per 2009 status, Borairalga is the gram panchayat of Kokradanga pt III Village.

References

Villages in South Salmara-Mankachar district